Willie Burnham, also listed as Willie B. Burnham and Willie Dee Burnham, was an American baseball pitcher in the Negro leagues. 
He played with the Monroe Monarchs from 1930 to 1934, including the 1932 season when the Negro Southern League was considered a major league. He also played for the Rayville Sluggers in 1932 of Rayville, Louisiana and the Shreveport Black Sports of Shreveport, Louisiana in 1940.

References

External links
 and Seamheads

Monroe Monarchs players
Year of birth missing
Year of death missing
Baseball pitchers